Pirs (meaning "pier") – also called Stykovochny Otsek 1 (SO-1; , "docking module") and DC-1 (Docking Compartment 1) – was a Russian module on the International Space Station (ISS). Pirs was launched on 14 September 2001, and was located on the Zvezda module of the station. It provided the ISS with one docking port for Soyuz and Progress spacecraft, and allowed egress and ingress for spacewalks by cosmonauts using Russian Orlan space suits. Pirs was docked to Zvezda for almost 20 years, until 26 July 2021, where it was decommissioned and undocked by Progress MS-16 to make way for the new Nauka module.

Poisk module 
A second docking compartment, Stykovochniy Otsek 2 (SO-2), was planned with the same design. However, when the Russian segment of the ISS was redesigned in 2001, the new design no longer included the SO-2, and its construction was canceled. After another change of plans the SO-2 module finally evolved into the Poisk module, which was added to the ISS in 2009.

Design and construction 

The docking compartment had two primary functions: provide a docking port for visiting Soyuz and Progress spacecraft and serve as an airlock for Russian EVAs. The docking port could accommodate one Soyuz-MS or one Progress-MS spacecraft. Visiting spacecraft could deliver people and cargo to and from to the space station. In addition, the Docking Compartment could transfer fuel from the fuel tanks of a docked Progress resupply vehicle to either the Zvezda Service Module Integrated Propulsion System or the Zarya Functional Cargo Block. It could also transfer propellant from Zvezda and Zarya to the propulsion system of docked vehicles — Soyuz and Progress. The two airlocks were used for spacewalks by cosmonauts wearing Russian Orlan-M spacesuits. The Pirs docking compartment was manufactured by RKK Energia. The Docking Compartment was similar to the Mir Docking Module used on the Mir space station. The docking compartment's planned lifetime as part of the station was five years.

Launch 
Pirs was launched on 14 September 2001, as ISS Assembly Mission 4R, on a Russian Soyuz-U launch vehicle, using a modified Progress spacecraft, Progress DC-1, as an upper stage. The  Pirs Docking Compartment was attached to the nadir (bottom, Earth-facing) port of the Zvezda service module.

Docking 

Pirs docked to the International Space Station on 17 September 2001, at 01:05 UTC, and was configured during three spacewalks by the Expedition 3 crew. Two Strela cargo cranes were later added by the STS-96 and STS-101 missions, carried up on Integrated Cargo Carriers and installed during EVAs.

Airlock specifications 
 Length: 
 Diameter: 
 Weight: 
 Volume:

Docking location at the ISS

Undocking and disposal 
On 14 July 2021, Roskosmos announced that members of the 65th expedition aboard the ISS, were preparing the Pirs module for its departure on 23 July.

Since then, the Pirs module supported 52 spacewalks and served as a docking port for Russian Soyuz and Progress ferry ships carrying crew and cargo to the space station. 
After nearly 20 years at the International Space Station, ISS, the Pirs Docking Compartment, SO1, undocked from the nadir (Earth-facing) port of the Zvezda Service Module, SM, on 26 July 2021, at 13:55 Moscow Time (6:55 a.m. EDT) in the joint stack with the Progress MS-16 cargo ship. At the time, the spacecraft was orbiting the Earth over the Eastern China and within communications range of Russian ground stations.

Within four minutes (13:59:00 Moscow Time, according to schedule), Progress MS-16 performed a short separation burn to increase distance from the ISS. The deorbiting maneuver was planned within around three hours aiming at the reentry of the Pirs/Progress stack over the Pacific.

According to NASA, Docking compartment spent 19 years, 313 days 9 hours 50 minutes and 45 seconds at the station and 19 years 315 days 15 hours 10 minutes and 47 seconds in flight.

Progress MS-16 initiated braking maneuver as planned at 17:01 Moscow Time (10:01 a.m. EDT) and after a 1,057-second (17.6-minute) burn, the module/cargo ship duo reentered the dense atmosphere at 17:42 Moscow Time (10:42 a.m. EDT).

Gallery

Outside

Inside

Undocking

References

External links 

  

Russian components of the International Space Station
Spacecraft launched in 2001
2001 in Russia
Spacecraft which reentered in 2021